Emma Matthews (née Lysons; born 1970) is an English-born Australian lyric coloratura soprano, noted for operatic roles, but also popular on the concert stage. A Principal Artist with Opera Australia, Matthews has received more Helpmann Awards than any other individual artist, nine Green Room Awards, the Mo Award and the Remy Martin Australian Opera Award.

Life and career
Born Emma Lysons in Manchester, England, she grew up with three younger sisters in Fiji, where her father worked as a maritime pilot, and Vanuatu before moving to Cairns, Queensland, Port Hedland, Western Australia, and finally Perth. There she attended Perth Modern School before studying musical theatre at the Western Australian Conservatorium of Music (part of the Western Australian Academy of Performing Arts, WAAPA), but was persuaded by a teacher to switch to opera. She sang with the Gilbert and Sullivan Society of Western Australia in 1990. Since her 1991 professional debut with the West Australian Opera and appointment to Opera Australia in 1993, she has appeared in every state of Australia, notably with the State Opera of South Australia, Victorian State Opera and Opera Queensland, in Adelaide, Melbourne as well as frequent appearances at the Huntington Estate Music Festival for Musica Viva from 1994. In 2017 Matthews was appointed Head of Classical Voice at the Western Australian Academy of Performing Arts.

She is married to Stephen Matthews, a former chorister and later a stage mechanic with Opera Australia.

Roles
Her first roles took advantage of her sweet light coloratura voice (capable of a top F6), her good looks, and her acting ability. She has appeared for Opera Australia as:
Damigella in L'incoronazione di Poppea (Monteverdi) in 1993
Ilia in Idomeneo (Mozart)
Hero in Béatrice et Bénédict (Berlioz)
Papagena and Pamina in The Magic Flute (Mozart)
Oscar in Un ballo in maschera (Verdi)
Sophie in Der Rosenkavalier (Richard Strauss)
Marie in La fille du régiment (Donizetti)
Nannetta in Falstaff (Verdi)
Rosina in The Barber of Seville (Rossini)
Blonde and Konstanze in Die Entführung aus dem Serail (Mozart)
Morgana in Alcina (Handel)
Almirena in Rinaldo (Handel)
Servilia in La clemenza di Tito (Mozart)
Cherubino in The Marriage of Figaro (Mozart)
Sophie in Werther (Massenet)
Adele in Die Fledermaus (Johann Strauss)

She has later taken on more challenging roles, often being compared with Joan Sutherland who, with her husband Richard Bonynge, was something of a friend and mentor.

Ismene in Mitridate, re di Ponto (Mozart) (produced by Graham Vick) for the 2001 Sydney Festival
Stasi in Die Csárdásfürstin (Kálmán)
Genovieffa in Suor Angelica (Puccini)
all four heroines (Stella, Olympia, Antonia, Giulietta) in The Tales of Hoffmann (Offenbach)
Zwaantie in Batavia (Richard Mills) 2001 world premiere 
Lulu in Lulu (Alban Berg)
Bystrouškain/Sharpears, the Vixen in The Cunning Little Vixen (Janáček) for Opera Australia
Philomele in The Love of the Nightingale (Richard Mills) – 2007 world premiere
Cleopatra in Giulio Cesare (Handel)
Juliette in Roméo et Juliette (Gounod)
Lakmé in Lakmé (Delibes)
Lucia in Lucia di Lammermoor (Donizetti)
Giulietta in I Capuleti e i Montecchi (Bellini)
Gilda in Rigoletto (Verdi)
Violetta in La traviata (Verdi)

Matthews has also been well received in concerts, with a repertoire from Mozart's Requiem, Haydn Masses, and Handel's Messiah to works by Brahms, Poulenc and Villa Lobos, and Mahler's Symphonies No. 2 and No. 4. She appeared with José Carreras in Sydney 2008, then on New Year's Eve in Mozart's Great Mass in C minor with Sir Charles Mackerras and the Sydney Symphony Orchestra.

Screen appearances
She appeared, billed as Emma Lysons, in the 1995 Alan John opera The Eighth Wonder about the Sydney Opera House, broadcast on ABC TV the night following its world premiere.

Discography

Albums

Awards and nominations

ABC Symphony Australia Young Performers Awards
The ABC Symphony Australia Young Performers Awards The ABC Young Performers Awards is a classical music competition for young people that ran annually from 1944 to 2015, and again from 2017.

! 
|-
| 1993
| Emma Matthews
| ABC Young Performers Award
| 
|-

ARIA Music Awards
The ARIA Music Awards is an annual awards ceremony that recognises excellence, innovation, and achievement across all genres of Australian music. They commenced in 1987. 

! 
|-
| 2009
| Emma Matthews in Monte Carlo
|rowspan="2" | Best Classical Album
| 
|rowspan="2" | 
|-
| 2014
| Mozart Arias (with Tasmanian Symphony Orchestra & Marko Letonja)
| 
|-

Green Room Awards
For her parts in Lulu, Clemenza di Tito, Rinaldo, The Marriage of Figaro, Batavia, Signor Bruschino, Julius Caesar and Lakmé.

Helpmann Awards
The Helpmann Awards is an awards show, celebrating live entertainment and performing arts in Australia, presented by industry group Live Performance Australia since 2001. Note: 2020 and 2021 were cancelled due to the COVID-19 pandemic.
 

! 
|-
| 2004
| Emma Matthews - Lulu
| Helpmann Award for Best Female Performer in an Opera
| 
|
|-
| rowspan="2"| 2005
| Emma Matthews - The Mikado
| Helpmann Award for Best Female Actor in a Musical
| 
| rowspan="2"|
|-
| Emma Matthews - Der Rosenkavalier
| Helpmann Award for Best Female Performer in a Supporting Role in an Opera
| 
|-
| rowspan="2"| 2006
| Emma Matthews - Lakmé
| rowspan="2"| Best Female Performer in an Opera
| 
| rowspan="2"|
|-
| Emma Matthews - Romeo & Juliet
| 
|-
| 2007
| Emma Matthews - The Love of the Nightingale
| Best Female Performer in an Opera
| 
|
|-
| rowspan="2"| 2008
| Emma Matthews - Les Contes d'Hoffmann
| Best Female Performer in an Opera
| 
| rowspan="2"|
|-
| Emma Matthews - Arabella
| Best Female Performer in a Supporting Role in an Opera
| 
|-
| 2010
| Emma Matthews - La sonnambula
| Best Female Performer in an Opera
| 
|
|-
| 2011
| Emma Matthews - Partenope
| Best Female Performer in an Opera
| 
|
|-
| 2012
| Emma Matthews - La Traviata
| Best Female Performer in an Opera
| 
|
|-
| 2013
| Emma Matthews - Lucia di Lammermoor
| Best Female Performer in an Opera
| 
|
|-
| 2014
| Emma Matthews - The Turk in Italy
| Best Female Performer in an Opera
| 
|
|-

Mo Awards
The Australian Entertainment Mo Awards (commonly known informally as the Mo Awards), were annual Australian entertainment industry awards. They recognise achievements in live entertainment in Australia from 1975 to 2016. Emma Matthews won one award in that time.
 (wins only)
|-
| 2003
| Emma Matthews
| Classical Performer of the Year
| 
|-

References

External links

"Ms Emma Matthews, Senior Lecturer, Head of Classical Voice", Edith Cowan University

1970 births
Living people
Australian operatic sopranos
Helpmann Award winners
Musicians from Manchester
People educated at Perth Modern School
Musicians from Perth, Western Australia
English emigrants to Australia
20th-century Australian women opera singers
21st-century Australian women opera singers